Vivek Vijayrao Polshettiwar (born 18 March 1979) is an Indian chemist who is a professor of chemistry at the Tata Institute of Fundamental Research. He was awarded the International Union of Pure and Applied Chemistry prize for Green Chemistry in 2022.

Early life and education 
Polshettiwar earned his master at Amravati University and doctorate at Jiwaji University in Gwalior. After earning his doctorate, he moved to the ENSCM: Ecole Nationale Suprieure de chimie de Montpellier in France, where he spent one year as a postdoctoral researcher. He was awarded an Oak Ridge Institute for Science and Education Research Fellowship and joined the United States Environmental Protection Agency in 2007.

Research and career 
In 2009, Polshettiwar launched his independent career at King Abdullah University of Science and Technology. He returned to India in 2013, where he started working on nanomaterials at the Tata Institute of Fundamental Research. His research considers nanocatalysis: the design of sustainable, reactive, stable and selective catalysts. He believes that the activity and kinetics of nanocatalysts can be influenced by tuning the morphology of the catalyst.

Polshettiwar has primarily focused on dendritic fibrous nanosilica, which has a fibrous structure that enhances the surface area on which reactions can occur. His innovations in producing efficient dendritic fibrous nanosilica catalysts were made possible by altering the nanoscale properties of the material, specifically, the spacing between the nanostructures themselves. These dendritic fibrous nanosilica catalysts can capture carbon dioxide and convert it to fuel and useful chemicals. He has created amorphous aluminosilicates that can convert plastics to hydrocarbons at low temperature, contributing to a circular economy.

Awards and honours 
 2015 Royal Society of Chemistry
 2016 Journal of Materials Chemistry A Rising Stars of Materials Chemistry
 2019 Fellow of the Maharashtra Academy of Sciences
 2019 Materials Research Society of India Medal 
 2020 Young Career Award in Nano Science & Technology by Nano Mission 
 2021 Fellow of the National Academy of Sciences of India
 2022 IUPAC-CHEMRAWN VII Prize for Green Chemistry

Selected publications

References 

Indian chemists
1979 births
Living people
Jiwaji University alumni
Academic staff of Tata Institute of Fundamental Research